Rafael de Gouveira Junior (born 16 November 1982) is a Brazilian equestrian. He competed in two events at the 2004 Summer Olympics.

References

External links
 

1982 births
Living people
Brazilian male equestrians
Olympic equestrians of Brazil
Equestrians at the 2004 Summer Olympics
Pan American Games medalists in equestrian
Pan American Games bronze medalists for Brazil
Equestrians at the 2003 Pan American Games
Sportspeople from São Paulo (state)
Medalists at the 2003 Pan American Games
20th-century Brazilian people
21st-century Brazilian people
People from Atibaia